Amir Ebrahimzadeh (born 	January 31, 2004) is an Iranian football forward who currently plays for Tractor in the Persian Gulf Pro League.

Club career

Tractor
He made his debut for Tractor in first fixtures of 2021–22 Persian Gulf Pro League against Gol Gohar while he substituted in for Mohammad Moslemipour.

References

Living people
2004 births
People from Ahar
Association football forwards
Iranian footballers
Tractor S.C. players
Persian Gulf Pro League players